Djeol  is a town and commune in Mauritania, near the border of Senegal.

Communes of Mauritania